Asian Neanderthals may refer to:

 Southwest Asian Neanderthals, at least 72 of which are known mostly from Israel and Iraq.
 Central Asian and North Asian Neanderthals, two of which are known from Uzbekistan (Central Asia) and three from Siberia (North Asia).